Boyd Douglas Kirkland (November 4, 1950 – January 27, 2011) was an American television director of animated cartoons. He was best known for his work on X-Men: Evolution and Batman: The Animated Series.  He suffered from idiopathic pulmonary fibrosis (IPF) and interstitial lung disease (ILD).  While in ICU at Ronald Reagan UCLA Medical Center, he died waiting for a lung transplant on January 27, 2011. He has a book dedicated to him called Guardians of the Galaxy Cosmic Team-Up.

Biographical background
Kirkland was raised in Utah as a member of the Church of Jesus Christ of Latter-day Saints (LDS Church).  He received his bachelor's degree in Business Administration from Weber State College in Ogden, Utah.  His career in animation started in 1979 as a layout artist.  This evolved into XAM! Productions, a partnership based in Salt Lake City that subcontracted for larger Los Angeles based studios.  He moved his family to Los Angeles in 1986.

Kirkland published articles about the nature of God in Mormon thought.  While a missionary for the LDS Church, Kirkland was confused about the Adam-God doctrine, ostensibly taught in the 19th century and denied in the 1970s, which led him to start questioning the current official church leaders.  After brief requests for answers from church leaders, Kirkland continued his own research into the controversy, resulting in articles published in Sunstone Magazine, Dialogue: A Journal of Mormon Thought, and chapters of Line Upon Line: Essays on Mormon Doctrine.

Kirkland worked as a producer for Attack of the Killer Tomatoes: The Animated Series, and with storyboards for G.I. Joe: The Movie, Little Nemo: Adventures in Slumberland, My Little Pony: The Movie, and Starchaser: The Legend of Orin.  He also worked on various Mormon cartoons from the Living Scriptures, Inc, including "The Savior in America" and "The Miracles of Jesus."

Notable works

Batman & Mr. Freeze: SubZero 

Batman & Mr. Freeze: SubZero is considered a major personal achievement in Boyd Kirkland's career. As a writer, director and producer on the film, he was seen as an integral part of the creative process. This gave him a unique opportunity to highly influence critical decisions, and to make the type of movie that he felt Batman fans would enjoy and appreciate.

Batman: Mask of the Phantasm 

Boyd Kirkland was a sequence director and storyboard artist for the 1993 film Batman: Mask of the Phantasm.

Batman: The Animated Series 

Boyd Kirkland was a writer and director for Batman: The Animated Series.

The Avengers: Earth's Mightiest Heroes 

Boyd Kirkland was a director for the show's second season. The episode "Michael Korvac" was dedicated to his life. The ending credits included the dedication, "In Loving Memory Of Boyd Kirkland: Friend, Father, Director, Avenger." After the dedication, the episode's end credits played in complete silence, which is highly unusual for an American television series.

Notes

External links 

Beyond Evolution: X-Men Evolution
Boyd Kirkland's Eulogy

American Latter Day Saint writers
American Mormon missionaries
Television producers from California
American television writers
American male television writers
American male screenwriters
American television directors
American storyboard artists
Artists from Los Angeles
Artists from Salt Lake City
Weber State University alumni
1950 births
2011 deaths
Writers from Los Angeles
Writers from Salt Lake City
Latter Day Saints from Utah
Latter Day Saints from California
Film directors from Los Angeles
American male non-fiction writers
Screenwriters from California
Screenwriters from Utah